Hawkwood may refer to:

Places
Hawkwood, Calgary, a neighbourhood in Calgary, Alberta, Canada
Hawkwood, London, a 25-acre estate in North Chingford, London, England
Hawkwood, Queensland, a locality in the North Burnett Region, Queensland, Australia
Hawkwood (Gordonsville, Virginia), United States, a historic house
Hawkwood College, an education centre in Gloucestershire, UK

People
Clifford Hawkwood (1909–1960), English cricketer.
John Hawkwood (c. 1323–1394), English soldier, mercenary and "condottiero" in Italy, known also as "Giovanni Acuto".
H. Bedford-Jones, Canadian writer who used the pen-name Allan Hawkwood.

Fiction
Hawkwood, a fictional character in the 1985 film Flesh and Blood
Matthew Hawkwood, the main character in the historical adventure novels by English novelist James McGee

See also
Hawk Woods

